Michel Foucault (1926–1984) was a prominent twentieth-century French philosopher, who wrote prolifically. Many of his works were translated into English. Works from his later years remain unpublished.

Monographs

Collège de France Course Lectures

Other Lectures 
In a 1967 lecture, titled in English as either "Different Spaces" or "Of Other Spaces" (reprinted in Aesthetics, Method, and Epistemology, and in The Visual Culture Reader, ed. Nicholas Mirzoeff), Foucault coined a novel concept of the heterotopia.

Collaborative works

Other books

Anthologies
In French, almost all of Foucault's shorter writings, published interviews and miscellany have been published in a collection called Dits et écrits, originally published in four volumes in 1994, latterly in only two volumes.

In English, there are a number of overlapping anthologies, which often use conflicting translations of the overlapping pieces, frequently with different titles. Richard Lynch's bibliography of Foucault's shorter work is invaluable for keeping track of these multiple versions. The major collections in English are:
 Language, Counter-Memory, Practice, edited by Donald F. Bouchard (1977)
 Power/Knowledge, edited by C. Gordon (1980)
 The Foucault Reader, edited by P. Rabinow (1984)
 Politics, Philosophy, Culture: Interviews and Other Writings, 1977–1984, translated by A. Sheridan, edited by L. D. Kritzman (1988)
 Foucault Live (2nd ed.), edited by Sylvère Lotringer (1996)
 The Politics of Truth, edited by Sylvère Lotringer (1997)
 Ethics: subjectivity and truth (Essential Works Vol. 1), edited by P. Rabinow (1997)
 Aesthetics, Method, Epistemology (Essential Works Vol.2), edited by J. D. Faubion (1998)
 Power (Essential Works Vol. 3), edited by J. D. Faubion (2000)
 The Essential Foucault, edited by P. Rabinow and N. Rose (2003)

Works available online
 Repository of texts from Foucault.info (excerpts from Discipline & punish, Archeology of knowledge, Heterotopia, History of Madness, etc.)
 Online audiorecording of Foucault at UC Berkeley, April 1983: "The Culture of the Self"
 "What are the Iranians Dreaming About?" – an excerpt from Foucault and the Iranian Revolution
 "Prison Talk" – interview with Foucault following the publication of Surveiller et punir (1975).
First three chapters of Archaeology of Knowledge

References

Bibliographies by writer

Bibliographies of French writers
Philosophy bibliographies